Daniel Vorländer (11 June 1867 – 8 June 1941) was a German chemist who synthesized most of the liquid crystals known until his retirement in 1935.

Vorländer was born in Eupen in Rhenish Prussia. He studied chemistry at Kiel, Munich, and Berlin, after which he became a professor at University of Halle-Wittenberg.

Vorländer applied his knowledge of molecular structure to select those exhibiting the crystalline liquid state. In particular a linear molecular geometry was conductive. "Over the years Vorländer and his students synthesized hundreds of liquid crystalline compounds. An interesting discovery was that amongst the slimy liquid crystals were many soap and soap-like compounds." (Dunmur & Sluckin p 48)

Vorländer served as a volunteer during World War I, during which he received the Iron Cross. He died in Halle.

References
 David Dunmur & Tim Sluckin (2011) Soap, Science, and Flat-screen TVs: a history of liquid crystals, pp 43–9, Oxford University Press  .

External links
catalogus-professorum-halensis

1867 births
1941 deaths
People from Eupen
20th-century German chemists
People from the Rhine Province
Recipients of the Iron Cross (1914), 2nd class
University of Kiel alumni
Ludwig Maximilian University of Munich alumni
Humboldt University of Berlin alumni
Academic staff of the Martin Luther University of Halle-Wittenberg